Guy Hardy Scholefield  (17 June 1877 – 19 July 1963) was a New Zealand journalist, historian, archivist, librarian and editor, known primarily as the compiler of the 1940 version of the Dictionary of New Zealand Biography.

Early life
Scholefield was born in Dunedin, New Zealand, on 17 June 1877. His father, John Hoick Scholefield, was an accountant. Marion, was his mother. After his father's death in 1885, the family relocated to Milton, where he received his secondary education at Tokomairiro District High School.

Professional life
Scholefield started work at 16 at the Bruce Herald as compositor and journalist. He then became a clerk at the Bruce Woollen Manufacturing Company, but produced material for print publications on the side. He moved to Wellington in 1899 and joined The New Zealand Times, where he enjoyed much journalistic freedom working on biographies of notable New Zealanders. He was admitted to the parliamentary press gallery in 1901.

Scholefield then undertook part-time study at Victoria University College. When he transferred his studies to Christchurch to continue at Canterbury College, he became associate editor of The Press; he held that latter role in 1903 and 1904. Returning to Wellington, he became chief of staff at The New Zealand Times in 1907. In the following year, he worked on the inaugural edition of Who's who in New Zealand and the western Pacific alongside Emil Schwabe. In 1908, he became the London correspondent for the New Zealand Associated Press, where he stayed until 1919. During WWI, he worked as a war correspondent in Europe and founded a newspaper for New Zealand expatriates resident in the United Kingdom. He studied at the London School of Economics and Political Science and graduated with a Bachelor of Science in 1915, and a Doctor of Science in 1919.

Scholefield was the second chief parliamentary librarian (May 1926 – March 1948) and succeeded Charles Wilson. 

In the 1919 King's Birthday Honours, Scholefield was appointed as an Officer of the Order of the British Empire for his services as a war correspondent. He was appointed as a Companion of the Order of St Michael and St George in the 1948 New Year Honours, in recognition of his services as parliamentary librarian and national archivist.

Family
On 17 June 1908, Scholefield married Adela Lucy Stapylton Bree at St Paul's Cathedral in Wellington. They left for London later that same month. The Scholefields had two sons and one daughter. He died in Wellington on 19 July 1963.

Bibliography

References

External links 

1877 births
1963 deaths
New Zealand librarians
20th-century New Zealand historians
New Zealand editors
New Zealand magazine editors
New Zealand journalists
Writers from Dunedin
Encyclopedists
People educated at Tokomairiro High School
New Zealand Officers of the Order of the British Empire
New Zealand Companions of the Order of St Michael and St George